Robyn Lea Rowland  (born 1952) is an Irish Australian poet, writer and retired academic.

Biography 
Rowland, a third generation Irish Australian, was born in Sydney, New South Wales in 1952. While researching her PhD, Rowland worked as a part-time tutor at the University of Wollongong.

Rowland was appointed Officer of the Order of Australia in the 1996 Queen's Birthday Honours for "service to women's issues, particularly in the fields of higher education and health as Foundation Head of the School of Social Inquiry at Deakin University and Director of the Australian Women's Research Centre".

Selected works

Nonfiction

Poetry

References

External links 

 

1952 births
Living people
20th-century Australian poets
21st-century Australian poets
Australian women's rights activists
Officers of the Order of Australia
20th-century Australian women